Bilal Yasin (born 14 December 1970) is a Pakistani politician who had been a member of the Provincial Assembly of the Punjab from August 2018 till January 2023. He had been a Member of the Provincial Assembly of the Punjab and an ex-cabinet member, from June 2013 to May 2018. He had been a Member of the National Assembly of Pakistan from 2008 to 2013. In December 2021 Bilal was shot, and both suspects were arrested.

Early life and education
He was born on 14 December 1970 in Lahore to Yasin Pehalwan who was a cousin of Kulsoom Nawaz.

He graduated in 1990 from University of the Punjab and has the degree  of Bachelor of Arts .

Political career
He was elected to the Provincial Assembly of the Punjab from Constituency PP-139 (Lahore-III) as a candidate of Pakistan Muslim League (N) (PML-N) in 2002 Pakistani general election. He received 17,171 votes and defeated Chaudhry Muhammad Asghar, a candidate of Pakistan Peoples Party (PPP).

He was elected to the National Assembly of Pakistan from Constituency NA-120 (Lahore-III) as a candidate of PML-N in 2008 Pakistani general election. He received 65,946 votes and defeated Jehangir Bader.

He was re-elected to the Provincial Assembly of the Punjab as a candidate of PML-N from Constituency PP-139 in 2013 Pakistani general election. He received 44,670 votes and defeated Mazhar Iqbal, a candidate of Pakistan Tehreek-e-Insaf (PTI). In June 2013, he was inducted into the provincial cabinet of Chief Minister Shahbaz Sharif and was made Provincial Minister of Punjab for Food.

He was re-elected to Provincial Assembly of the Punjab as a candidate of PML-N from Constituency PP-150 (Lahore-VII) in 2018 Pakistani general election.

References

Living people
1970 births
Punjab MPAs 2002–2007
Pakistani MNAs 2008–2013
Punjab MPAs 2013–2018
Pakistan Muslim League (N) MPAs (Punjab)
Pakistan Muslim League (N) MNAs
University of the Punjab alumni
Punjab MPAs 2018–2023